Far East is a 1998 play by American playwright A.R. Gurney.

Productions
Far East was first produced at the Williamstown Theatre Festival, Massachusetts in July 1998. The director was Daniel Sullivan, with a cast that featured Scott Wolf, Bill Smitrovich, Linda Emond, Tohoru Masamune, and Paul Fitzgerald. It premiered Off-Broadway at Lincoln Center's Mitzi E. Newhouse Theater in January 1999. The director was Daniel Sullivan, with a cast that featured Michael Hayden, Sonnie Brown, Lisa Emery, Bill Smitrovich, and Connor Trinneer. It has since been produced in regional theatres, including the Studio Theatre in Washington, DC in 2001 and the  Laguna Playhouse, California in 2002.

The play was presented on the hit Public Television series Stage on Screen in 2001.

Publication

Far East is published by Broadway Play Publishing Inc.

References

External links
List of Works, A.R. Gurney
Internet Off-Broadway listing, 'Far East'

Plays by A. R. Gurney
1998 plays
Off-Broadway plays